Winogradskyella wandonensis is a Gram-negative, aerobic and rod-shaped bacterium from the genus of Winogradskyella which has been isolated from tidal flat from Wando  from Korea

References

Flavobacteria
Bacteria described in 2014